Langelurillus holmi is a jumping spider species in the genus Langelurillus that lives in Kenya. The male was first described in 1994 by Maciej Próchniewicz.

References

Fauna of Kenya
Salticidae
Spiders described in 1994
Spiders of Africa